Homalopoma linnei is a species of sea snail, a marine gastropod mollusc in the family Colloniidae.

Description
The shell size reaches 6 mm. It is a species that belong to the Homalopoma genus. Its original name is Leptothyra linnei Dall, 1889.

Distribution
This species occurs at depths between 80 m and 1472 m in the Gulf of Mexico off Florida and in the Caribbean Sea off Cuba; off St. Lucia, Barbados; in the Atlantic Ocean off Brazil.

References

External links
 

Colloniidae
Gastropods described in 1889